José Iñaki Alonso Rodríguez (born 7 August 1968) is a Spanish football manager.

Manager career
Born in Durango, Biscay, Basque Country, Alonso began his managerial career at local SCD Durango, and subsequently managed neighbours SD Eibar B, in Tercera División. In 2004, he was appointed SD Lemona manager, always achieving mid-table positions in his three-year spell.

On 19 July 2007 Alonso was appointed at the helm of Real Unión. In the 2008–09 campaign, after knocking out Real Madrid in Copa del Rey, he led the Txuri-beltz back to Segunda División after a 44-year absence.

On 17 July 2010, after suffering relegation back with Real Unión, Alonso joined Real Murcia. He renewed with the club on 21 June of the following year, after returning to the second level at first attempt.

On 19 June 2012, after being relegated, Alonso was sacked. On 7 July of the following year he was appointed Huracán Valencia CF manager.

On 16 June 2014 Alonso was appointed at SD Compostela in the third level, being relieved from his duties on 16 November 2015. On 4 July 2016 he was appointed at Lorca FC, but only lasted six matchdays.

On 10 June 2017, Alonso became the head coach of Croatian First Football League team NK Rudeš, but left in December and returned to his home country with Deportivo Alavés' Juvenil A squad the following 4 January. On 4 March 2019, he took over the B-team in the fourth tier, and led the side back to division three months later.

Alonso renewed his contract until 2021 on 12 July 2019, but left the Miniglorias on a mutual agreement on 5 February 2021. On 10 November, Alonso was named in charge of Costa Rican side Deportivo Saprissa, but was sacked on 7 April 2022.

Alonso returned to Spain on 17 January 2023, after being named in charge of Gimnàstic de Tarragona in Primera Federación. On 26 February, after one win in just six matches, he was dismissed.

Managerial statistics

References

External links

1968 births
Living people
Spanish football managers
Segunda División managers
Segunda División B managers
Tercera División managers
Real Unión managers
Real Murcia managers
Huracán Valencia CF managers
SD Compostela managers
Lorca FC managers
Deportivo Alavés B managers
NK Rudeš managers
Deportivo Saprissa managers
Gimnàstic de Tarragona managers
Spanish expatriate football managers
Expatriate football managers in Croatia
Expatriate football managers in Costa Rica
Spanish expatriate sportspeople in Croatia
Spanish expatriate sportspeople in Costa Rica